Schürer is a German surname. Notable people with the surname include:

 Emil Schürer (1844–1910), German Protestant theologian
 Johann Georg Schürer ( 1720–1786), Bohemian-German composer

See also
2429 Schürer, main-belt asteroid

German-language surnames